The final of the Men's 1500 metres Freestyle event at the European LC Championships 1997 was held on Sunday 1997-08-24 in Seville, Spain.

Finals

See also
1996 Men's Olympic Games 1500m Freestyle
1997 Men's World Championships (SC) 1500m Freestyle

References
 scmsom results

F